The discography of American country music artist Susan Raye consists of nineteen studio albums, seven compilation albums and thirty-two singles.

Studio albums

Collaborations with Buck Owens

Compilation albums

Singles

Singles with Buck Owens

B-sides

References

External links

Country music discographies
Discographies of American artists